The Samsung SGH-X427m is a lightweight mobile phone.  Its features include a 500-name phone book, 40 polyphonic ring tones, a calendar, a to-do list, a memo pad, and a WAP 2.0 wireless web browser.

History
The SGH-X427m was originally released in 2003 by Cingular Wireless, and Samsung.

Reviews
The SGH-X427m has a consumer rating of 3 out of 5 stars on Cnet.  The phone was described as not being a full feature phone but being small and light weight.

References

Samsung mobile phones
Mobile phones introduced in 2003